Daniel or Danny García may refer to:

Entertainment
 Daniel Garcia (director) (born 1975), American music video and commercial director
 Daniel García Andújar (born 1966), visual media artist, activist, and art theorist from Spain
 Member of filmmaking duo Rania Attieh and Daniel Garcia

Sports 
 Danny Garcia (outfielder) (born 1954), Kansas City Royals
 Danny Garcia (second baseman) (born 1980), New York Mets
 Danny Garcia (boxer) (born 1988), American boxer
 Daniel García González (born 1984), Andorran judoka
 Daniel García (racewalker) (born 1971), Mexican race walker
 Dani García (footballer, born 1974), Spanish footballer
 Dani García (footballer, born 1990), Spanish footballer
 Danny Garcia (soccer) (born 1993), American soccer player
 Daniel Garcia Soto, ring name Stefano, wrestled in Puerto Rico
 Daniel Garcia, aka Huracán Ramírez (1926–2006), Mexican wrestler
 Daniel Garcia (wrestler), American wrestler

Other
 Daniel E. Garcia (born 1960), American prelate of the Roman Catholic Church
 Danny Garcia (activist), American Christian peace activist and founder of Global Walk

See also
 García (surname)